papercranes is a Los Angeles-based band which features actress/singer Rain Phoenix on vocals. Her younger sister Summer Phoenix also occasionally plays piano/keyboards with the band. Their debut full-length album was released in 2006.

History
papercranes was formed in 2003 in Gainesville, Florida by actress/singer Rain Phoenix. They play mostly in and around the Gainesville area. They independently released their debut self-titled EP in 2004. Their debut full-length album, titled Vidalia, was released in September 2006. A tour followed. The band chronicled their tour escapades in video clips on their web site. A second album titled Let's Make Babies in the Woods was released in 2011 on Los Angeles indie label Manimal Vinyl. Their third album titled Three was released in November 2012 via Manimal.

Former and occasional band members
Aaron Kant, Peter Mcneal, Margaret Briggs, Alexis Fleisig, John Jackson, Norm Block Jack Irons (drums)
Jason Chesney, Mike Rotolante, Daniel Green, Flea, Mark McAdam, Dan Komin (bass)
Mark McAdam, Kirk Hellie (Guitar)
Summer Phoenix (piano/keyboard)
Amy Cavanaugh, Julia Kent, Dermot Mulroney (cello)
Scott McCaughey (pump organ)
Jason Borger (keyboards)
Michael Amish (programming/bass/keyboards/rhodes/wurlitzer/guitar)
Liberty Phoenix (backup vocals)

Releases
 2004 - Papercranes EP#1 
 2006 - Vidalia 
 2011 - Let's Make Babies in the Woods 
 2012 - Three

References

External links
 

Musical groups from Gainesville, Florida
2003 establishments in Florida
Musical groups established in 2003